Hesham Yakan Zaki (born 10 August 1962) is a retired Egyptian football player. He is the son of football player Yaken Zaki. He was born in Cairo. Yakan played defender for Zamalek and the Egypt national football team. He played for Egypt at the 1990 FIFA World Cup.

Titles as a player 

Personal
Participated in World Cup 1990
For Zamalek
4 Egyptian leagues for Zamalek (83/84-87/88-91/92-92/93)
1 Egyptian Cup (87/88)
3 African Champion leagues for Zamalek (84-86-93)
1 African Super Cup for Zamalek (1994)
1 Afro-Asian Club Championship for Zamalek (1988)

Titles as a Manager 
For Zamalek
1 Egyptian league for Zamalek (2003/2004)
1 Arab Club Championship (2003)
1 Egyptian Saudi Super Cup (2003)

References

External links

1962 births
Living people
Egyptian footballers
Egypt international footballers
1990 FIFA World Cup players
1988 African Cup of Nations players
1992 African Cup of Nations players
Zamalek SC players
Egyptian football managers
Egyptian Premier League players
Association football defenders